Pigeonhed is an American electronic band from Seattle that combines elements of funk, soul, trip hop, and lo-fi.  The band is a collaboration of Shawn Smith and Steve Fisk, that released three albums during the period from 1993 to 1997. They reconvened in 2010. In 2015, they announced they were preparing to release their "lost" album 'Des Colores'.  As of December 2019, no release has been made. Soundgarden lead guitarist Kim Thayil provided significant instrumental contributions to each album. They are best known for their Prince homage "Battle Flag", which, as remixed by Lo Fidelity Allstars, enjoyed brief popularity in US and UK clubs and indie radio stations.

Discography
Studio albums
Pigeonhed (1993)
The Full Sentence (1997)

References

External links
Webpage on Subpop Records
Shawn Smith's official website - includes official Pigeonhed discography

Sub Pop artists
Musical groups from Washington (state)
Musical groups established in 1993
Musical groups disestablished in 1997
Musical groups reestablished in 2010
Musical groups disestablished in 2019